Verbeke is a Dutch toponymic surname. It is a contraction of Van der Beek, meaning "from the creek". It is particularly common in West Flanders. Notable people with the surname include:

André Verbeke (1908–1978), Belgian architect
Annelies Verbeke (born 1976), Belgian author and playwright
Johan C. Verbeke (born 1951), Belgian politician
 (1910–2001), Belgian philosopher and Roman Catholic priest
Grace Verbeke (born 1984), Belgian road racing cyclist
 (1922–2004), Dutch jazz saxophonist
Johan C. Verbeke (born 1951), Belgian diplomat, Ambassador to the UK and the US 
Kristel Verbeke (born 1975), Belgian singer, actress, and dancer
Natalia Verbeke (born 1975), Argentinina-born Spanish actress
Peter Verbeken (born 1966), Belgian racing cyclist
Saartje Verbeke, Belgian linguist and Indo-Aryanist
Siegfried Verbeke (born 1941), Belgian neo-Nazi and Holocaust denier

See also
Verbeek
Verbeeck
Jules Verbecke (1879–?),  French swimmer and water polo player

References

Dutch-language surnames
Surnames of Belgian origin
Toponymic surnames